1995 Júbilo Iwata season

Review and events

League results summary

League results by round

Competitions

Domestic results

J.League

Emperor's Cup

Player statistics

 † player(s) joined the team after the opening of this season.

Transfers

In:

Out:

Transfers during the season

In
 Dunga (from VfB Stuttgart on June)

Out

Awards
none

Notes

References

Other pages
 J. League official site
 Júbilo Iwata official site

Jubilo Iwata
Júbilo Iwata seasons